María de Jesús de las Angustias Juana Nepomuceno de Iturbide y Huarte (February 22, 1818 — July 10, 1849) was the daughter of Agustín de Iturbide and Ana María Huarte. She received the title of Mexican Princess during the First Mexican Empire by the Constituent Congress. She was better known as Isis.

Her Highness, the Princess Isis de Iturbide took the habits of a nun in exile in the United States.

Decree 
The Sovereign Mexican Constituent Congress decreed on June 22, 1822 the following:

Art 1 °. The Mexican Monarchy, in addition to being moderate and Constitutional, is also hereditary.
Art 2 °. Consequently, the Nation calls the succession of the Crown for the death of the current Emperor, his firstborn son Don Agustín Jerónimo de Iturbide. The Constitution of the Empire will decide the order of succession of the throne.
Art 3 °. The crown prince will be called "Prince Imperial" and will have the treatment of Imperial Highness.
Art 4 °. The legitimate sons and daughters of H.I.M will be called "Mexican Princes", and will have the treatment of Highness.
Art 5 °. Don José Joaquín de Iturbide y Arreguí, Father of H.I.M, is decorated with the title of "Prince of the Union" and the treatment of Highness, during his life.
Art 6 °. It is also granted the title of "Princess of Iturbide" and the treatment of Highness, during his life, to Doña María Nicolasa de Iturbide y Arámburo, sister of the Emperor.

Ancestry

References 

House of Iturbide
1818 births
1849 deaths
Daughters of emperors
Nobility of the Americas